The Roman Catholic Metropolitan Archdiocese of Lahore is a Latin Metropolitan Archdiocese in Punjab province, Pakistan.

Its episcopal seat is the Sacred Heart Cathedral in Lahore.

History 
In 1594 the Mughal emperor Akbar invited some Catholic priests from Goa to stay permanently at his court. This group of Jesuit missionaries arrived in the Punjab and were able to build a church, where they celebrated Christian ceremonies, and receive adults into the Church.

It was founded in 1880 as Apostolic Vicariate of Punjab, on territory split off from the Apostolic Vicariate of Agra (now also a Metropolitan Archbishopric).

On 1 September 1886 it was promoted and renamed after its see as Diocese of Lahore.
 
It lost vast territories repeatedly:
 on 6 July 1887 to establish the Apostolic Prefecture of Kafiristan and Kashmir
 on 13 September 1910 to establish the then Metropolitan Roman Catholic Archdiocese of Simla (now a suffragan of Delhi)
 on 17 December 1936 to establish the Apostolic Prefecture of Multan (now its suffragan diocese)
 on 17 January 1952 to establish the Apostolic Prefecture of Jalandhar and the Apostolic Prefecture of Kashmir and Jammu

On 15 November 1888, the Congregation for the Propagation of the Faith asked the Order of Friars Minor Capuchin to manage the Diocese of Lahore.

On 23 April 1994 the diocese was elevated to the rank of Metropolitan Archdiocese. Fr. Lawrence Saldanha was appointed Archbishop of Lahore by pope John Paul II.

On 7 April 2011 Archbishop Saldanha retired as Archbishop of Lahore.

On 18 December 2011, the archdiocese began celebrations to mark its 125th anniversary. Seventy-five priests and 200 catechists served then in 608 Mass centres in the archdiocese.

Pope Francis on 3 July 2013 appointed Fr. Joseph Arshad of the Lahore Archdiocese as the bishop of the Faisalabad Diocese.

Bishops

Apostolic Vicar of Punjab 
 Paul Tosi, OFM Cap. (1 September 1886 – 10 August 1888)

Bishops of Lahore 
 Symphorien Mouard, OFM Cap. (10 August 1888 – 14 July 1890)
 Emmanuel van den Bosch, OFM Cap. (21 November 1890 – 2 May 1892)
 Godefroid Pelckmans, OFM Cap. (2 June 1928 – 4 July 1946)
 Fabian Antoine Eestermans, OFM Cap. (11 April 1905 – 17 December 1925)
 Hector Catry, OFM Cap. (28 March 1928 – 4 July 1946)
 Marcel Roger Buyse, OFM Cap. (23 March 1967 – 10 July 1975)
 Felicissimus Raeymaeckers, OFM Cap. (12 March 1967 – 10 July 1975)
 Armando Trindade (10 July 1975 – 23 March 1994)

Metropolitan Archbishops of Lahore 
 Armando Trindade (23 March 1994 –  31 July 2000)
 Lawrence Saldanha (24 April 2001 – 7 April 2011)
 Sebastian Francis Shaw, OFM (14 November 2013 – )

Province 
Its ecclesiastical province comprises the Metropolitan's own archdiocese and the following suffragan bishoprics:
 Roman Catholic Diocese of Faisalabad 
 Roman Catholic Diocese of Islamabad–Rawalpindi
 Roman Catholic Diocese of Multan

Extent 
The Sacred Heart Cathedral is the principal church of the archdiocese. The archdiocese is also home to St. Joseph’s Church, Lahore, the oldest church of the Punjab, built in 1853.

The archdiocese also publishes the Catholic Naqib, the oldest Urdu-language Catholic journal, founded in Lahore in 1929.

In 1964 the diocese opened the 215 bed Bethania Hospital, Sialkot which focuses mainly on preventing and treating TB. In 2008 it was treating 60,000 patients a year.

Lahore archdiocese had 511,226 Catholics, 30 diocesan priests, and 214 nuns, according to the 2001 Annuario Pontificio, the Vatican yearbook. The largest Catholic archdiocese in Pakistan is divided into 26 parishes.

The archdiocese is also home to the St. Francis Xavier Seminary.

The country’s 1st National Eucharistic Congress was organised by the local Catholic Church 9–11 September 2005 at the Marian Shrine of Mariamabad, Lahore diocese. It drew 20,000 participants and attracted ample media coverage local and national.
The national Marian shrine of Mariamabad is situated 90 km from Lahore. Every year it draws thousands of clergy, religious and laity, families, other Christians and Muslims. Mariamabad shrine was opened in 1949 by a Belgian Capuchin Friar Frank who died a martyr.

On 14 Feb 2009 Fr. Sebastian Francis Shah OFM was appointed Auxiliary Bishop of Lahore.

The diocese is also home to Catholic TV, Pakistan the first Pakistani Catholic TV channel launched in 2009.

In 2019, the Archdiocese had 29 parishes, 32 diocesan seminarians and 27 religious communities.

Schools in the Diocese 
There were 57,744 students in Catholic schools in the archdiocese - 33 primary schools and 59 high schools. Some of the schools are:
St. Anthony's High School, Cantonment, Lahore
St. Joseph's English High School, Gujranwala
Convent of Jesus and Mary, Sialkot
Presentation Convent School, Jhelum
Convent of Jesus and Mary (Ambala Cantt)
Sacred Heart High School for Boys
Sacred Heart High School for Girls
St. Anthony's Girls School, Sangla Hill
St. Anthony's High School (Lahore), Lawrence Road
St. Joseph's English High School
St. Thomas' High School, Jhelum
Don Bosco Technical Institute, Lahore
St. Paul's High School, Gujranwala
Don Bosco High School
St. Anthony's High School, Faisal Town, Lahore
St. Thomas' School, Gulberg
St. Mary's High School, Lahore.
 Franciscan Girls High School, Lahore
 St. Lawrence High School, Gulberg, Lahore
 St. Mary's High School, Gujranwala
 St Francis High School, Lahore

See also 
 Christianity in Pakistan
 Roman Catholicism in Pakistan

References

Source and External links 
 Official website of the diocese (in English)
 GigaCatholic, with incumbent biography links

Roman Catholic dioceses in Pakistan
Roman Catholic Archdiocese of Lahore
Roman Catholic Archdiocese of Lahore
Roman Catholic dioceses and prelatures established in the 19th century
A